Boston Bridge Works (also known as Boston Bridge Works, Inc.) was a popular engineering firm, building bridges throughout New England, during the late nineteenth and early twentieth centuries. Operating out of Boston, they specialized in the drafting, design and implementation of both road and railway truss bridges, a popular bridge style of that period.

Boston Bridge Works was established in 1876 by David H. Andrews, building notable bridges, such as the 1892 Harvard Bridge between Cambridge and Boston.  The company also built bridges for many New England railroads including the Boston and Maine Railroad and Boston and Providence Railroad.

Employees of the company were engineers and contractors for steel bridges, buildings, roofs, and railway turntables. The general offices, for most of their operating years, were at 47 Winter Street, Boston, with a plant in East Cambridge.

After both a fire at their Cambridge plant, and declining contracts during the Great Depression, Boston Bridge Works went out of business in 1938.

Notable bridges

References

Further reading

Bridgehunter (Boston Bridge Works)

Engineering companies of the United States